Cool Cool Rider is the second studio album for Beenie Man and his debut on VP Records.

Track listing
"Hey"
"Cu-Cum Looks"
"Tek Him Money"
"Full a Glamity"
"Shot Em Up"
"Mi Arrow"
"Cool Cool Rider"
"Yu Body Good"
"Tell Me Now"
"Which One"
"Ghetto Youths"
"A Nuh Strength"

References

Beenie Man albums
1992 albums
VP Records albums